Chula Vista, formerly known as Rosita North, is a census-designated place (CDP) in Maverick County, Texas, United States. The population was 3,400 at the 2000 census.

Geography
Chula Vista is located at  (28.653362, -100.426004).

Demographics
As of the census of 2000, there were 3,400 people, 813 households, and 765 families residing in the CDP. The population density was 1,111.8 people per square mile (429.0/km2). There were 961 housing units at an average density of 314.2/sq mi (121.3/km2). The racial makeup of the CDP was 66.71% White, 0.32% African American, 0.97% Native American, 29.44% from other races, and 2.56% from two or more races. Hispanic or Latino of any race were 98.15% of the population.

There were 813 households, out of which 66.2% had children under the age of 18 living with them, 79.8% were married couples living together, 10.8% had a female householder with no husband present, and 5.8% were non-families. 4.3% of all households were made up of individuals, and 2.2% had someone living alone who was 65 years of age or older. The average household size was 4.18 and the average family size was 4.33.

In the CDP, the population was spread out, with 42.9% under the age of 18, 9.4% from 18 to 24, 29.6% from 25 to 44, 13.2% from 45 to 64, and 5.0% who were 65 years of age or older. The median age was 23 years. For every 100 females, there were 97.7 males. For every 100 females age 18 and over, there were 93.1 males.

The median income for a household in the CDP was $17,451, and the median income for a family was $18,667. Males had a median income of $16,658 versus $13,750 for females. The per capita income for the CDP was $5,482. About 45.4% of families and 48.1% of the population were below the poverty line, including 53.7% of those under age 18 and 56.5% of those age 65 or over.

Education
Chula Vista is served by the Eagle Pass Independent School District.

References

Census-designated places in Maverick County, Texas
Census-designated places in Texas